Alpo Suhonen (born 17 June 1948) is a Finnish former ice hockey coach.

He and Ivan Hlinka of the Pittsburgh Penguins were the first European-born NHL head coaches in 52 years.

Coaching career
Suhonen worked for the Finnish ice hockey federation in the late 1970s until 1986. He coached the junior national teams and took charge of the men's national team in 1982. He was head coach of Team Finland at the 1984 Olympic Games and at four World Championships.

After coaching Zürcher SC of Switzerland for two years (1986–1988) and a short stint at the helm of Finnish Liiga side HPK, he served as head coach of AHL's Moncton Hawks in 1989 and then joined the coaching staff of the Winnipeg Jets, working as an assistant.

In 1993–94, Suhonen coached Jokerit to the Finnish championship and then embarked on a two-year stint with EHC Kloten. He guided the team to back-to-back Swiss championships in 1995 and 1996.

In March 1997, he was named head coach of IHL's Chicago Wolves on an interim basis, but did not return for the following season.

Suhonen was appointed head coach of the Chicago Blackhawks in May 2000 and was the first European born head coach in the National Hockey League since Johnny Gottselig in 1948. Suhonen lasted less than a year as head coach of the Hawks, as he resigned next spring because of heart problems. There was frequent criticism to Suhonen's coaching citing lack of discipline and a country club atmosphere among the players.

Suhonen returned to Finland and served as head coach of Liiga outfit HIFK from January 2002 until the end of the 2002–03 campaign. In November 2004, he took over head coaching duties at SC Bern of the Swiss National League A (NLA). He coached the team to a NLA semifinal appearance in the 2004–05 season and to the quarterfinals the following season. He was released afterwards.

Suhonen took the head coaching job at Finnish Ässät on 14 November 2007 and remained in that job until July 2009. Later that month, he was appointed as sport director of the Kloten Flyers in Switzerland. He stepped down in August 2010 due to personal reasons.

In the 2011–2012 season, he had a short stint as head coach of Slovak Extraliga club HC 05 Banska Bystrica. On the first day of November, he resigned as head coach, but he remains in the structures of the club.

In June 2012, Suhonen accepted the position as sport director of the Austrian ice hockey federation. In May 2016, he additionally took over the country's men's national team as head coach. Suhonen left the Austrian federation when his contract expired in 2017.

Other activities
Suhonen also produced a Finnish version of Cat on a Hot Tin Roof and ran for a spot in the European Parliament. At the time he was also the CEO of music festival Pori Jazz, and he has also written several books in Finnish.

Coaching record

References

External links
 

1948 births
Living people
Ässät players
Chicago Blackhawks coaches
Chicago Wolves coaches
Finland men's national ice hockey team coaches
Finnish ice hockey coaches
Finnish ice hockey players
Jokerit players
Karhut Pori players
People from Valkeakoski
SC Bern coaches
Toronto Maple Leafs coaches
Winnipeg Jets (1972–1996) coaches
Ässät coaches
Sportspeople from Pirkanmaa